Buzz FM Aba is a radio station based in Aba, the commercial city of Abia State, Nigeria. Established on 1 January 2019, the broadcaster transmits programs daily on 89.7 FM.

See also
Magic FM Aba

Notes 

Radio stations in Nigeria
Radio stations established in 2019
2019 establishments in Nigeria